West Gaoke Road is an interchange station between Lines 6 and 7 of the Shanghai Metro. It began operation on 29 December 2007 with the opening of line 6 and became an interchange station with line 7 on 5 December 2009.

Station Layout

See also
 Zhangjiang Hi-Tech Park, for which the road is named

References 

Railway stations in Shanghai
Shanghai Metro stations in Pudong
Line 6, Shanghai Metro
Line 7, Shanghai Metro
Railway stations in China opened in 2007